Tautenhain is a municipality in the district Saale-Holzland, in Thuringia, Germany.

References

Municipalities in Thuringia
Saale-Holzland-Kreis